Cherrybrook Technology High School is a purpose-built government technology high school located at 28–44 Purchase Road, Cherrybrook NSW, Australia. The school was built in the late 1980s to support the rapid growth of the north-west sector in Sydney. With the school's completion and opening in 1992 the sheer size and capabilities of the school have grown beyond expectations. In 2002 a new two storey building with administration facilities on the ground floor and 12 classrooms on the top level was opened, bringing the permanent housing of the school up to 1250 students. 2009 saw the student population rise to over 2,000 for the first time.

History and development

School development 
The school's development and planning began in the late 1980s. The Department of Education and Community at the time had decided to build the school on a block of land adjacent to John Purchase Public School; the land was previously occupied with orchards containing remnants of old growth forest. At the time the government was creating a chain of technology schools throughout NSW. The school was initiated into this chain after talks between the Minister of Education at the time, Terry Metherell, and the then CEO of IBM, Brian Finn.

The school hired its first principal and deputies in 1990 with Lyn Wendtman as Principal and Peter Gillam and Dave Wilson as Deputy Principals. These three key figures took their duties up in February 1991 and were responsible for complex negotiations between businesses, public works, designers and builders. They also developed a local P&C, school council, school organisation, staffing and enrolment models and draft policies.

The first students accepted into Cherrybrook Technology High School were accommodated and taught at Pennant Hills High School in 1991. They relocated to their new school in 1992. In 2008, Cherrybrook Technology High School achieved a peak enrolment of 1993 students, making it the largest public comprehensive secondary school in NSW and one of the largest schools in Australia.

Staff in 1992 was gained from both transfers and selections based on merit. Additional staff in the following years were all appointed by merit, with several highly talented young teachers proving themselves to the parents and students of the schooling community. Cherrybrook Technology High School was officially opened on 15 May 1992 by the Hon Nick Greiner (who was the Premier of New South Wales at the time).

Sports houses 
Cherrybrook Technology High School has four main sports houses: Charles, Taylor, Harrison and Strickland. These houses have been named according to the Abbreviated Acronym of the school. However, their names also have an underlying meaning.

C (Charles [Red]) stands for community and was named after Timothy Charles, who was the first President of the P&C at the school.
T (Taylor [Yellow]) stands for technology, and was named after Headlie Taylor who developed a new style harvester in the 1920s.
H (Harrison [Green]) stands for history, and was named after the Harrison family who settled on a  block in the area in 1893 and had a small timber cottage called "Cherrybrook Cottage."
S (Strickland [Blue]) stands for sport and was named after Shirley Strickland who won more medals for Australia than any other sports person in running events.

These names and meanings were accepted in 1992 after being proposed by David Krust (head of PDHPE department at the time).

Theatre 
Each year at Cherrybrook Technology High School, a play or musical is produced.
1994 - "WarGames"
1995 - "Romeo and Juliet"
2001 - "The Wiz"
2002 - "Away"
2003 - "Bye Bye Birdie" 
2004 - "Stories From Suburban Road"
2005 - "Joseph and the Amazing Technicolor Dreamcoat"
2006 - "Everyman"
2007 - "Return to the Forbidden Planet" 
2008 - "A Midsummer Night's Dream"
2009 - "HMS Pinafore"
2010 - "The Musicians"
2011 - "Fame"
2012 - "Madd"
2013 - "Little Shop Of Horrors"
2014 - "The Wiz"
2015 - "Servant of Two Masters"
2016 - "Grease"
2017 - "A Midsummer Night's Dream"
2019 - "Annie"
*note: due to licensing issues the production of "Annie" was postponed by one year

Student Representative Council 
Cherrybrook Technology High School has an active Student Representative Council (SRC) which is responsible for co-ordinating events which benefit the student body and the school as a whole. The events put on by the SRC are used largely to raise funds for charities within Australia and abroad. Events in the past have included 'Wacky Hair Day', 'Superheroes and Villains Day', 'Valentine's Day' and 'Super Mega Happy Week'. The SRC aims to hold events which are not only enjoyable for students - but also encourage school spirit.
In 2008 the SRC also attempted to break the world record for the most people simultaneously dancing "Heads, Shoulders, Knees and Toes" with approximately 700 participants. The student executive responsible for the organisation of the event were interviewed two days after this event on the popular breakfast program Sunrise.

Senior executive staff 
When the school opened in 1992 Lyn Wendtman was Principal, while Dave Wilson and Peter Gillam were appointed as her deputy principals. In 2016 the senior executive team comprises Gary Johnson, Brett Clements, Jenny Bevan and Matt Townsend. The following table shows when each started and finished at the school. Following this year it is expected that a new system will be implemented, where students will be permitted to vote for any teachers in the school to become the new senior executive team.

Notable alumni
 Michael Guy Chislett, lead guitarist, backup vocalist and pianist of The Academy Is...
 Kenny Sabir, musician and label founder of Elefant Traks
 Jai Courtney, actor
 Jenny Blundell, Australian Olympic athlete specialising in middle-distance running
 Jeffrey Welfare, vocalist of Capture (band)
 Lisa Sthalekar, former captain of Australia women’s national cricket team
 Ryan Siew, lead guitarist of Polaris (Australian band)
 Sven Holston, Captained Indoor Cricket New South Wales

Notable staff 
 Eddie Woo - Maths teacher

References

External links
 Address to Parliament including a report on Cherrybrook Technology High School
 Information on the Origins of Cherrybrook Technology High School
 Information on the logo of Cherrybrook Technology High School
 Information on house names and meanings of Cherrybrook Technology High School
 A link to a video of CTHS students attempting to break a world record

Public high schools in Sydney
School buildings completed in 1992
1992 establishments in Australia